Glyptorhagada tattawuppana is a species of air-breathing land snails, terrestrial pulmonate gastropod mollusks in the family Camaenidae. This species is endemic to Australia.

References

Gastropods of Australia
tattawuppana
Vulnerable fauna of Australia
Gastropods described in 1992
Taxonomy articles created by Polbot